Aric Nesbitt (born January 25, 1980) is a member of the Michigan Senate, representing the 20th district, which includes most of Van Buren County, Central Allegan County, Northern Berrien County and Byron Township & Gaines Township in Kent County. He serves as the minority leader of the Michigan State Senate and previously served as President pro tempore. He received the Distinguished Alumnus of the Year Award from Hillsdale College for being a conservative reformer. He previously represented the 66th District in the Michigan House of Representatives and served as the Michigan Lottery Commissioner from 2017 to 2018.  Nesbitt was elected in November 2010 to the Michigan House of Representatives, served three terms, and served as the House Majority Floor Leader and chair of the House Committee on Energy & Technology. He is a member of the Republican Party and resides south of Lawton, Michigan with his wife, Trisha, daughter, Catherine, and son, William.

Early life 
Nesbitt grew up on a six generation family dairy & grape farm in Porter Township, just south of Lawton in Van Buren County. He is the middle of five kids, with two older brothers and two younger sisters. He said this taught him the values of hard work, self-government, and independence. His dad served three tours in Viet Nam and came back home to run the family dairy farm. He served as a page in the U.S. House of Representatives during his junior year of high school and was a delegate to the American Legion Boy's Nation between his junior and senior year of high school.

Education 
Nesbitt graduated from Lawton High School in 1998, the same school as his father and grandfather. During his senior year of high school he was dual enrolled at Kalamazoo Valley Community College.  He earned a B.A. in economics from Hillsdale College December 2001 and later earned his master's degree in international business from Norwegian School of Economics, NHH.

Roles within MI Legislature 

2023–Present
Senate Republican Leader
Minority Vice-Chairman, Government Operations Committee

2019–2022
Senate President Pro-Tempore
Chairman, Regulatory Reform Committee
Chairman, Appropriation Subcommittee on Licensing & Regulatory Affairs and Insurance & Financial Services
Chairman, Advice & Consent Committee
Vice-chairman, Finance Committee
Vice-chairman, Joint Select Committee on the COVID-19 Pandemic
Member, Appropriations Committee
Member, Government Operations Committee
Member, Energy & Technology Committee
Member, Insurance & Banking Committee

2015–2016
House Majority Floor Leader
Chairman, Energy Committee
Member, Elections Committee
Chairman, Michigan House Republican Campaign Committee

2013–2014
Chairman, Energy and Technology Committee
Member, Commerce Committee
Member, Tax Policy Committee
Member, Insurance Committee
Chairman, Michigan House Republican Campaign Committee

2011–2012
Vice Chair, Government Operations Committee
Member, Energy and Technology Committee
Chairman, Subcommittee on Natural Gas
Member, Tax Policy Committee
Member, Education Policy Committee

Electoral history

References

|-

1980 births
21st-century American politicians
Hillsdale College alumni
Living people
Republican Party members of the Michigan House of Representatives
Republican Party Michigan state senators
People from Van Buren County, Michigan